{
  "type": "ExternalData",
  "service": "geoline",
  "ids": "Q2728829",
  "properties": {
    "title": "E265",
    "stroke": "#007f00",
    "stroke-width": 3
  }
}

European route E265 is a B-class E-road, part of the inter-European road system. It runs through Estonia, connecting Tallinn to Paldiski, and from Paldiski has ferry access to the port of Kapellskär, Sweden. In Estonia, E265 follows the Estonian National Road 11 (Tallinn Ring Road) and part of Estonian National Road 8 (from Keila to Paldiski).

References

External links 
 UN Economic Commission for Europe: Overall Map of E-road Network (2007)

265
E265